The theory of association schemes arose in statistics, in the theory of experimental design for the analysis of variance. In mathematics, association schemes belong to both algebra and combinatorics. In algebraic combinatorics, association schemes provide a unified approach to many topics, for example combinatorial designs and coding theory. In algebra, association schemes generalize groups, and the theory of association schemes generalizes the character theory of linear representations of groups.

Definition 

An n-class association scheme consists of a set X  together with a partition S of X × X into n + 1 binary relations, R0, R1, ..., Rn which satisfy:

 and is called the identity relation.
Defining , if R in S, then R* in S

Most authors assume this property.

A symmetric association scheme is one in which each  is a symmetric relation. That is:

 if (x, y)  ∈ Ri, then (y, x) ∈ Ri. (Or equivalently, R* = R.)

Every symmetric association scheme is commutative.

Note, however, that while the notion of an association scheme generalizes the notion of a group, the notion of a commutative association scheme only generalizes the notion of a commutative group.

Two points x and y are called i th associates if . The definition states that if x and y are i th associates then so are y and x. Every pair of points are i th associates for exactly one . Each point is its own zeroth associate while distinct points are never zeroth associates.

Graph interpretation and adjacency matrices 

A symmetric association scheme can be visualized as a complete graph with labeled edges. In particular, each vertex is incident with exactly  edges labeled ;  is the valency of the relation .

I.  is symmetric,
II.  (the all-ones matrix),
III. ,
IV. .

The (x, y)-th entry of the left side of (IV) is the number of paths of length two between x and y with labels i and j in the graph. Note that the rows and columns of  contain  's:

Terminology 
The numbers  are called the parameters of the scheme. They are also referred to as the structural constants.

History 
These authors were studying what statisticians have called partially balanced incomplete block designs (PBIBDs). The most important contribution to the theory was the thesis of P. Delsarte  who recognized and fully used the connections with coding theory and design theory. Generalizations have been studied by D. G. Higman (coherent configurations) and B. Weisfeiler (distance regular graphs).

Basic facts 

, this is because the  partition .

The Bose–Mesner algebra 

The adjacency matrices  of the graphs  generate a commutative and associative algebra  (over the real or complex numbers) both for the matrix product and the pointwise product. This associative, commutative algebra is called the Bose–Mesner algebra of the association scheme.

Therefore,  is semi-simple and has a unique basis of primitive idempotents .

Examples 

The Johnson scheme, denoted J(v, k), is defined as follows.  Let S be a set with v elements.  The points of the scheme J(v, k) are the  subsets of S with k elements.  Two k-element subsets A, B of S are i th associates when their intersection has size k − i.
The Hamming scheme, denoted H(n, q), is defined as follows.  The points of H(n, q) are the qn ordered n-tuples over a set of size q.  Two n-tuples x, y are said to be i th associates if they disagree in exactly i coordinates.  E.g., if x = (1,0,1,1), y = (1,1,1,1), z = (0,0,1,1), then x and y are 1st associates, x and z are 1st associates and y and z are 2nd associates in H(4,2).
A distance-regular graph, G, forms an association scheme by defining two vertices to be i th associates if their distance is i.
The class of the group identity is R0. This association scheme is commutative if and only if G is abelian.
A specific 3-class association scheme:
Let A(3) be the following association scheme with three associate classes on the set X = {1,2,3,4,5,6}. The (i, j&hairsp;) entry is s if elements i and j are in relation Rs.

Coding theory 

The Hamming scheme and the Johnson scheme are of major significance in classical coding theory.

In coding theory, association scheme theory is mainly concerned with the distance of a code.  The linear programming method produces upper bounds for the size of a code with given minimum distance, and lower bounds for the size of a design with a given strength. The most specific results are obtained in the case where the underlying association scheme satisfies certain polynomial properties; this leads one into the realm of orthogonal polynomials. In particular, some universal bounds are derived for codes and designs in polynomial-type association schemes.

In classical coding theory, dealing with codes in a Hamming scheme, the MacWilliams transform involves a family of orthogonal polynomials known as the Krawtchouk polynomials. These polynomials give the eigenvalues of the distance relation matrices of the Hamming scheme.

See also 

 Block design
 Bose–Mesner algebra
 Combinatorial design

Notes

References 

 . (Chapters from preliminary draft are available on-line.)
 
 
 
 
 
 
 
 
 
 

 
 
 
 

Design of experiments
Analysis of variance
Algebraic combinatorics
Representation theory